The Immorality and Prohibition of Mixed Marriages Amendment Act, 1985 (Act No. 72 of 1985) is an act of the Parliament of South Africa that repealed the laws prohibiting marriage and sexual intercourse between white people and people of other races. It was one of the early legislative steps towards the end of apartheid.

Background
The act repealed section 16 of the Immorality Act, 1957, which prohibited extramarital sex between a white person and a non-white person. It also made other consequential amendments related to the repeal of section 16, and removed the higher penalties for brothel-keeping and procuring when the sex in question was interracial. It also amended certain sections of the Criminal Procedure Act, 1977, that referred to violations of section 16.

It also repealed the Prohibition of Mixed Marriages Act, 1949, which prohibited a white person and a non-white person from contracting a marriage and invalidated any such marriage contracted outside South Africa by a South African citizen or resident. The repeal did not automatically validate such marriages previously invalidated, but allowed the spouses to apply to the Director-General of Home Affairs to have the marriage validated.

See also
 Immorality Act

References

External links

South African legislation
1985 in South African law
Marriage law
Marriage, unions and partnerships in South Africa
Interracial marriage